Adeuomphalus is a genus of sea snails, marine gastropod molluscs unassigned to family within the superfamily Seguenzioidea.

Species
Species within the genus Adeuomphalus include:
 Adeuomphalus ammoniformis (Seguenza, 1876)
 Adeuomphalus axistriatus Hoffman, Gofas & Freiwald, 2020
 † Adeuomphalus bandeli (Schröder, 1995) 
 Adeuomphalus collinsi Chikyu & Warén, 2009
 Adeuomphalus crenulatus (Powell, 1937)
 Adeuomphalus curvistriatus Hoffman, Gofas & Freiwald, 2020
 Adeuomphalus densicostatus (Jeffreys, 1884)
 Adeuomphalus diegoalejandroi Fernández-Garcés, Rubio & Rolán, 2019
 Adeuomphalus elegans Chikyu & Warén, 2009
 Adeuomphalus guillei Chikyu & Warén, 2009
 Adeuomphalus misaeli Fernández-Garcés, Rubio & Rolán, 2019
 Adeuomphalus orientalis (Thiele, 1925)
 Adeuomphalus sinuosus (Sykes, 1925) 
 Adeuomphalus trochanter Warén & Bouchet, 2001
 Adeuomphalus valentinae Fernández-Garcés, Rubio & Rolán, 2019
 Adeuomphalus xerente Absalão, 2009
Species brought into synonymy
 Adeuomphalus laevis Rindone, 1990: synonym of Eudaronia aperta (Sykes, 1925)

References

 Palazzi S. & Gaglini A. (1979). Taxonomic notes on the Rissoidae and related families. The genus Ammonicerina O. G. Costa, 1861. Notiziario del C.I.S.MA. 1 (1): 29-37
 Kano Y., Chikyu, E. & Warén, A. (2009) Morphological, ecological and molecular characterization of the enigmatic planispiral snail genus Adeuomphalus (Vetigastropoda: Seguenzioidea). Journal of Molluscan Studies, 75:397-418

External links

 Seguenza G. (1873-1877). Studi stratigrafici sulla formazione pliocenica dell'Italia meridionale. Bollettino, Reale Comitato Geologico d'Italia, Roma, 4: 29-45, 84-103, 131-153, 213-230, 280-301, 345-357 [1873]; 5: 3-15, 67-85, 146-152, 271-283, 331-347 [1874]; 6: 18-31, 82-99, 145-152, 203-211, 275-283, 339-345 [1875]; 7: 7-15, 91-103, 179-189, 260-271, 355-359 [1876] 8: 7-17, 91-99, 359-367

 
Gastropod genera